Frederick R. Jones (1910 – after 1936) was an English professional footballer who played in the Football League for Birmingham.

Jones was born in Halesowen, then part of Worcestershire. An inside forward, he played local football for Halesowen Town and had a trial with Huddersfield Town before joining Leeds United. Jones moved on to Birmingham in 1934 without playing first-team football for Leeds. Described as "an enterprising forward, not afraid to make an unorthodox move when he thinks the occasion warrants it", Jones made his debut – the only game he played for Birmingham's first team – in the First Division on 1 September 1934, as a late replacement for the injured Joe Bradford in a game at Stoke City which Birmingham lost 2–0. Jones later played for Cheltenham Town.

Notes
A.  Sources including Michael Joyce's Football League Players' Records 1888 to 1939 appear to attribute this game to Wilson Jones, who had not joined Birmingham by then.

References

1910 births
Year of death missing
People from Halesowen
English footballers
Association football forwards
Halesowen Town F.C. players
Leeds United F.C. players
Birmingham City F.C. players
Cheltenham Town F.C. players
English Football League players
Date of birth missing
Place of death missing